Rouhollah Askari Gandmani (born 8 January 1982 in Borujen) is an Iranian hurdler. He competed in the 110 m hurdles event at the 2012 Summer Olympics.

Competition record

References

1982 births
Living people
Iranian male hurdlers
Olympic athletes of Iran
Athletes (track and field) at the 2012 Summer Olympics
Athletes (track and field) at the 2010 Asian Games
Athletes (track and field) at the 2006 Asian Games
Asian Games competitors for Iran
Competitors at the 2005 Summer Universiade
Islamic Solidarity Games competitors for Iran
Islamic Solidarity Games medalists in athletics